There are two different kinds of shooting records in Malaysia and certified by the National Shooting Association of Malaysia (NSAM):
 National record, more commonly referred to in Malaysia as the rekod kebangsaan: the best score recorded anywhere in the world by a sport shooter or team holding Malaysian citizenship.
 Malaysian All-Comers record: the best score recorded within Malaysia by a sport shooter or team regardless of nationality.
Key to tables:

Legend: # – Record awaiting ratification by National Shooting Association of Malaysia; WR – World record; AS – Asian record; CR – Commonwealth record

Current Malaysian national records

Men

Women

Current Malaysian national junior records

Men

Women

Current Malaysian All-Comers records

Men

Women

See also
List of Sukma records in shooting

References

External links
 List of Malaysian records in shooting as of 23 July 2016
 List of Malaysian junior records in shooting as of 23 July 2016
 List of Sukan Malaysia records in shooting as of 23 July 2016

Records
Malaysia
Shooting
Malaysia